This is the discography of American electronic music producer Kill the Noise. His discography consists of one studio album, three remix albums, four extended plays, 15 singles, and 34 remixes.

Albums

Studio albums

Remix albums

Extended plays

Singles

As lead artist

As featured artist

Guest appearances

Remixes

References

Electronic music discographies